"Some Assembly Required" is episode two of season two of Buffy the Vampire Slayer. It was written by staff writer Ty King and directed by Bruce Seth Green. The narrative follows the Scooby Gang as they find body parts all over Sunnydale High School. They follow the trail of the clues to find something more gruesome. Meanwhile, Buffy confronts Angel about their relationship, Willow admits that she loves Xander to Buffy and Ms. Calendar and Giles' romance begins to blossom, as she asks him on a date. There's only one problem: their date is interrupted by Eric and his sinister plans.

Plot
Buffy is waiting for a vampire to rise when she falls into an open grave. A body was apparently dragged out from it earlier.

The next day, Buffy and Xander catch Giles practicing to ask Jenny Calendar out on a date. Giles hears Buffy's findings at the cemetery and fears someone is raising an army of zombies. Buffy goes to find Willow, who is signing up for the science fair and talking to Chris, the reigning champ. As Buffy approaches, Chris' friend Eric takes pictures of girls passing by.

Willow finds that the girl missing from the open grave, Meredith Todd, died in a car accident. That night, Cordelia is walking to her car when she senses that someone is following her. She hides in a dumpster and when she thinks it is safe to get out, she encounters Angel. He starts to help her out when she picks up a girl’s hand, and they find other body parts inside the dumpster. The Scoobies return to the library to find a frightened Cordelia clinging to Angel. They decide to abandon Giles' zombie theory and search the lockers of science students. They find medical books and an article on Meredith in Chris's locker and a jigsaw of female body parts in Eric's locker.

In a secret lab, Chris and Eric are almost finished assembling a girl's body, except for the head. Eric lines up three candidates: Buffy, Willow and Cordelia. Chris' brother Daryl comes out from the shadows, showing a grotesque appearance, and chooses Cordelia. Daryl was a popular athlete who died in a hiking accident years ago, but he was revived by his brother and promised a stay-at-home companion.

The next day, Giles stumbles as he tries to ask Jenny out, but she ends up asking him to the football game instead. Meanwhile, Buffy and her friends discover that Chris and Eric must actually kill a girl to gain the head they need.

Buffy finds a lab in Chris's house and discovers their target is Cordelia. In the locker room, Cordelia is getting ready when Chris comes up behind her. Eric places a bag over her head, but is fought off by Buffy. After Cordelia leaves, Chris tells Buffy about Daryl. They head back to his house, only to find Daryl gone.

Daryl drags her away. He and Eric head to an abandoned building, where Eric plans to behead her. At the game, Buffy and Chris realize they arrived too late, but Chris tells her where to find Eric.

Meanwhile, Willow and Xander crash Giles and Jenny’s date. Chris tells them what happened, while Buffy rushes to the old science lab. In the ensuing fight, a burner is knocked over and starts a fire. Xander arrives with the rest of the gang and gets Cordelia out. Giles and Willow drag out an unconscious Eric. As Daryl is about to kill Buffy, Chris stops him. Daryl decides to die beside the unfinished girl's body while everyone else escapes.

Reception
“Some Assembly Required” had an audience of 3.2 million households.

References

External links
 

Buffy the Vampire Slayer (season 2) episodes
1997 American television episodes
Television episodes about zombies
Works based on Frankenstein
Television episodes about abduction

it:Episodi di Buffy l'ammazzavampiri (seconda stagione)#Pezzi di ricambio